The 1984 NCAA Women's Soccer Tournament was the third annual single-elimination tournament to determine the national champion of NCAA women's collegiate soccer. The championship game was again played at Fetzer Field in Chapel Hill, North Carolina during December 1984.

North Carolina defeated Connecticut in the final, 2–0, to win their third consecutive national title. The Tar Heels were coached by Anson Dorrance.

The most outstanding player was April Heinrichs (North Carolina), the most outstanding offensive player was  Amy Machin (North Carolina), and the most outstanding defensive player was Shelley McElroy (Connecticut). An All-Tournament team was not named this year. 

The leading scorer for the tournament was Catherine Spence from Massachusetts (5 goals).

Qualification
At the time, there was only one NCAA championship for women's soccer; a Division III title was added in 1986 and a Division II title in 1988. Hence, all NCAA women's soccer programs  (whether from Division I, Division II, or Division III) were eligible for this championship. The tournament field expanded for the first time this year, from 12 to 14 teams.

Bracket

See also 
 NCAA Division I women's soccer championship
 1984 NCAA Division I Men's Soccer Championship

References

NCAA
NCAA Women's Soccer Championship
 
NCAA Women's Soccer Tournament